Régis Wargnier (born 18 April 1948) is a French film director, film producer, screenwriter and film score composer. His 1992 film Indochine won the Academy Award for Best Foreign Language Film at the 65th Academy Awards. His 1995 A French Woman was entered into the 19th Moscow International Film Festival where he won the Silver St. George for the Direction.

Filmography

Director

1986 : La Femme de ma vie starring Jane Birkin
1988 : Sueurs froides (television series)
1989 : Je suis le seigneur du château starring Dominique Blanc
1992 : Indochine starring Catherine Deneuve
1995 : Une femme française starring Emmanuelle Béart
1995 : Lumière et compagnie, collection of short films in cooperation with other international directors
1999 : Est-Ouest starring Sandrine Bonnaire
2003 : Cœurs d'Athlètes starring Haile Gebrsellasie
2005 : Man to Man starring Joseph Fiennes and Kristin Scott Thomas
2007 : Pars vite et reviens tard starring José Garcia, Lucas Belvaux and Marie Gillain
2011 : La Ligne droite starring Rachida Brakni and Cyril Descours
2014 : The Gate starring Raphaël Personnaz and Olivier Gourmet

Assistant director
1973 : La Femme en bleu
1974 : Nada
1978 : Mon premier amour
1979 : L'École est finie
1980 : La Banquière
1981 : Viens chez moi, j'habite chez une copine
1982 : Le Grand Patron
1982 : Le Grand Frère
1984 : Le Bon Plaisir
1984 : Souvenirs, souvenirs

Screenwriter

1986 : La Femme de ma vie avec Jane Birkin
1989 : Je suis le seigneur du château avec Dominique Blanc
1992 : Indochine avec Catherine Deneuve
1992 : L'échange
1995 : Une femme française
1999 : Est-Ouest
2005 : Man to man
2007 : Pars vite et reviens tard
2014 : The Gate

Actor

1973 : La Femme en bleu
1984 : Souvenirs, souvenirs
2002 : Femme fatale

Composer
2002 : Femme fatale

Special effects
2001 : Who is Bernard Tapie

Producer
1983 : Heller Wahn
1983 : La palombière

References

External links
 

1948 births
French film directors
French film producers
French film score composers
French male film score composers
French male screenwriters
French screenwriters
Living people
Writers from Paris
Members of the Académie des beaux-arts
Directors of Best Foreign Language Film Academy Award winners